Staffordshire County Cricket Club was formed in 1871.  The county first competed in the Minor Counties Championship in 1895.  They then appeared again in 1899 and have been competing continuously ever since.  They have appeared in forty List A matches, making seven Gillette Cup, twenty-five NatWest Trophy and eight Cheltenham & Gloucester Trophy appearances.  The players in this list have all played at least one List A match.  Staffordshire cricketers who have not represented the county in List A cricket are excluded from the list.

Players are listed in order of appearance, where players made their debut in the same match, they are ordered by batting order.  Players in bold have played first-class cricket.

Key

List of players

List A captains

References

Staffordshire County Cricket Club
Staffordshire
Cricketers